Sorcerers of the Magic Kingdom was an interactive game found in the Magic Kingdom at the Walt Disney World Resort in Florida. The premise of the game is that Hades is trying to take over the Magic Kingdom and Merlin is recruiting park guests as new apprentices. The player, in the position of new apprentice sorcerers helps Merlin the Magician thwart Hades' plan by attacking notorious Disney villains that can be found throughout the park's themed lands (except Tomorrowland) by using special spell cards.

On January 7, 2021, it was announced that the game would be shut down as a result of "changes in guest use of mobile technology" and a general decline in interest, with the game's final day being set for January 24.

Story 
Having grown tired of the dreary scenery in the Underworld, Hades decides to make the Magic Kingdom his new summer home; however, Merlin would be able to easily repel an invasion with the power of his magic crystal. In an attempt to outwit Merlin, Hades sends Pain and Panic to steal the crystal, but their bumbling leads to the crystal being shattered into eight pieces that scatter to each area of the Magic Kingdom. Merlin recruits the player to help him find the pieces of his crystal, giving them magical cards with the Sorcerer's Crest on them; the crest itself is used when specifically needed.

Needing help himself, Hades revives Ursula, Maleficent, Scar and Dr. Facilier, promising them second lives in exchange for a crystal fragment. The two witches have schemes of their own to usurp power. Posing as Boss Teal - Underworld Crime Boss, Lord Indigo of the East Underworld Trading company, Prince Azure, Yama, the god of the dead, and Lazuli, god of the underworld, Hades also promises Cruella, Ratcliffe and Yzma something they each want in exchange for help; the 99 puppies, Pocahontas' land, and to be empress of Adventureland respectively. Under the alias and disguise "Prince Azure", Hades also forces genie Jafar into helping. Though he meant to guide the player throughout the kingdom, Merlin forced to fight off Hades' lesser pawns that are trying to invade. Therefore, the player's guidance comes from a foe of each villain: Sebastian, Merryweather, Rafiki, Mama Odie, Pongo, Pocahontas, Kuzco, and Genie.

When all the villains are defeated, the magic crystal is restored. However, Hades isn't one to give up; he sends in Chernabog - his "Number 1 Guy". Unfortunately, it was only a distraction to let Pain and Panic try stealing the crystal again; they predictably fail. Deciding to use brute force, Hades amasses his army of the dead, which is led by the other villains. Through Merlin's guidance, the player uses the magic of the Sorcerer's Crest to seal Hades and the villains inside the mystic crystal. The crystal is then returned to Merlin's study. Inside the crystal, Hades is left to wonder what went wrong with his plans.

Gameplay 

There is no additional charge to play the game, unless players opt to buy cards or the card binder at the Emporium or the Frontier Trading Post. Players begin by going to the Fire Station on Main Street USA to get the game set up and linked to a magic band or entry key. Once linked, players must keep their original band or card in order to save their progress.

First-time players are given a thorough run-through of the game at the Fire Station. There was formerly a card distribution location behind the Christmas shop in Liberty Square, but this location has since closed.

Once set up, players will be given a set of cards and a map, and be told where to begin. The game is played at portals marked on the map in Main Street, Adventureland, Frontierland/Liberty Square, and Fantasyland. Tomorrowland does not have any portals. Each land with portals has five, though construction can limit this number.

Players activate a portal by placing their key (band/card) next to the keyhole. Once activated, an animation will play and players will follow the story from there. The animation is captioned, so hearing-impaired guests can play. Players 'fight' the villains by showing their spell cards when prompted to 'Cast your Spell'. Some interactions require the use of 'Sorcerer's Crest', which is on the back of the card. There are cameras in the wall by the animation screens that read the cards as they are presented. Lighting and angle/distance can affect the read, which can cause an unexpected mechanical level of difficulty. Regardless of the outcome of the 'fight', at the conclusion, players will be directed to another location symbol which matches a location on the map. If players travel to the wrong portal, the portal will notify them and re-display the correct location of the portal.

There are ten main villains and additional associated henchmen. Each have strengths and weaknesses based on the type of cards used.

There are three levels of difficulty: easy, medium, and hard. Easy and Medium follow the strength and weakness listing, but as of 2013, Hard was changed to a random strength and weakness per villain

There is no time limit, and the game can be played during peak ride-wait times or as a specific activity.

Special Edition Cards 
During Mickey's Not-So-Scary Halloween Party and Mickey's Very Merry Christmas Party, all guests attending are eligible to receive a complimentary special edition holiday-themed card. Only one is allowed per guest and they can be picked up at the Fire Station in Town Square.

Cards 
The Spell Cards in the game are divided into nine different spell classes: Toy, Machine, Animal, Fairy, Hero, Princess, Warrior, Monster, and Mystic, along with seven different types of attacks: Charming, Energy, Gross, Quick, Strong, Flying, and Wishful.

A card's rarity is classified by the symbol in the bottom left corner, right above the number out of 70. A Planet means that the card is common, a Crescent Moon means it is uncommon, a Star means it is rare and a Lightning Bolt means it is ultra rare.

Cards 61-70 started to be re-distributed via booster packs beginning in August 2012. These booster packs feature seven cards, tokens, and one of four gameboards for a home version of the game.

Also, beginning with the 2012 Mickey's Not-So-Scary Halloween and Very Merry Christmas parties, special limited edition spell cards exclusive to those events started to be produced.

References

Magic Kingdom
Walt Disney World
Amusement park attractions introduced in 2012
Amusement park attractions that closed in 2021